Sunshine Beach is a coastal town and suburb in the Shire of Noosa, Queensland, Australia.

History
The area south of Noosa Headlands was formerly known as Golden Beach but was rarely visited before the 1920s. In 1928, Thomas Marcus Burke gained land there in exchange for building roads and bridges from Tewantin. After World War II it was marketed by his son, Marcus, as Sunshine Beach.

Sunshine Beach State School opened on 25 January 1982.

Saint Thomas More Primary School is a Roman Catholic Primary school that in 1990 by The Noosa District Roman Catholic Parish and is staffed by the Brisbane Catholic Education Centre. It is a Marist school.

Sunshine Beach State High School opened on 1 January 1992.

Noosa Flexible Learning Centre opened on 23 January 2006.

Although currently and historically within the Shire of Noosa, between 2008 and 2013 the entire Shire of Noosa including Sunshine Beach was within the Sunshine Coast Region.

Amenities
Sunshine Beach is home to the Sunshine Beach Surf Lifesaving Club from which volunteers patrol the beach every weekend from September school holidays to ANZAC Day.

Education
Sunshine Beach State School is a government primary (Prep-6) school for boys and girls at David Low Way. In 2018, the school had an enrolment of 799 students with 52 teachers (47 full-time equivalent) and 25 non-teaching staff (18 full-time equivalent). It includes a special education program.

St Thomas More Primary School is a Catholic primary (Prep-6) school for boys and girls at Ben Lexcen Drive. In 2018, the school had an enrolment of 765 students with 50 teachers (41 full-time equivalent) and 37 non-teaching staff (21 full-time equivalent).

Montessori Noosa is a private primary (Prep-5) school for boys and girls at 2 Bicentennial Drive. In 2018, the school had an enrolment of 40 students with 3 teachers and 2 non-teaching staff (1 full-time equivalent).

Sunshine Beach State High School is a government secondary (7-12) school for boys and girls at 45 Ben Lexcen Drive. In 2018, the school had an enrolment of 1401 students with 112 teachers (103 full-time equivalent) and 50 non-teaching staff (39 full-time equivalent). It includes a special education program.

Noosa Flexible Learning Centre is a Catholic secondary (7-12) school for boys and girls at 2 Girraween Court. In 2018, the school had an enrolment of 88 students with 8 teachers (6 full-time equivalent) and 12 non-teaching staff (10 full-time equivalent).

References

External links
 

Suburbs of Noosa Shire, Queensland
Towns in Queensland
Beaches of Queensland